Pseudotomoxia fasciata is a species of beetle in the genus Pseudotomoxia of the family Mordellidae, which is part of the superfamily Tenebrionoidea. It was discovered in 1931 by Pic.

References

Beetles described in 1931
Mordellidae